Solar power in Thailand is targeted to reach 6,000 MW by 2036.
In 2013 installed photovoltaic capacity nearly doubled and reached 704 MW by the end of the year.
At the end of 2015, with a total capacity of 2,500-2,800 MW, Thailand has more solar power capacity than all the rest of Southeast Asia combined.

Thailand has great solar potential, especially the southern and northern parts of the northeastern region of Udon Thani Province and certain areas in the central region. Around 14.3% of the country has a daily solar exposure of around 19–20 MJ/m2/day, while another 50% of the country gains around 18–19 MJ/m2/day. In terms of solar potential, Thailand lags behind the US, but is ahead of Japan.

The 84 MW Lopburi Solar Farm was completed in May 2013. German solar energy company Conergy signed a contract with Thailand's Siam Solar Energy to construct three solar plants of 10.5 MW each in addition to existing two solar plants that have been under construction since autumn 2012.

In 2021, the world’s largest hybrid solar-hydropower project, the Sirindhorn floating solar farm, commenced operations.

Power purchase scheme 
In January 2015, Thailand's Energy Regulatory Commission (ERC) announced a new regulation for the purchase of electricity from ground-mounted solar projects, replacing the "adder" scheme with the "feed-in-tariff" (FiT) scheme. The regulation aims to revive the investment in renewable energy projects in Thailand after a quiet period in the renewable energy sector in 2014. There are over one hundred projects, with a total capacity of 1,000 MW, whose applications have not yet been accepted under the adder scheme and therefore are eligible for the feed-in-tariff scheme.

Statistics

See also 

Renewable energy
Solar power
Photovoltaics
Solar power by country
Photovoltaic system
Photovoltaic power station
Growth of photovoltaics
Wind power in Thailand
Hydroelectricity in Thailand
Renewable energy in Thailand
Renewable energy by country

References

 
Thailand